Arthur Lapworth FRS (10 October 1872 – 5 April 1941) was a Scottish chemist.

He was born in Galashiels, Scotland, the son of geologist Charles Lapworth, and educated at St Andrew's and King Edward's School, Birmingham. He graduated in chemistry from Mason College (later Birmingham University). From 1893 to 1895 he worked on a scholarship at City and Guilds of London Institute on the chemistry of camphor and the 3
mechanism of aromatic substitution.

His first post, in 1895, was as a demonstrator in the School of Pharmacy, University of London in Bloomsbury. He became head of the chemistry department of Goldsmiths Institute, and in 1909 became senior lecturer in inorganic and physical chemistry at the University of Manchester. In 1913 he was appointed professor of organic chemistry; and in 1922, the Sir Samuel Hall Professor (of inorganic and physical chemistry) and director of laboratories.

He was a pioneer of the field of physical organic chemistry. His proposal for the reaction mechanism for the benzoin condensation is the basis for our modern-day understanding of organic chemistry.

He retired in 1935 and was appointed Professor Emeritus. He was elected a Fellow of the Royal Society in May 1910, and was awarded their Davy Medal in 1931. Lapworth was also an Hon. LL.D. of Birmingham and of St Andrews universities.

He married Kathleen Florence Holland at St Mary, Bridgwater on 14 September 1900. Her brothers were eminent scientists themselves, in 1900. (Frederick Stanley Kipping and William Henry Perkin, Jr.). Arthur Lapworth retired in 1935 and died on 5 April 1941 in a nursing home in Withington.

References

1872 births
1941 deaths
People from Galashiels
Scottish chemists
Fellows of the Royal Society
Alumni of the University of Birmingham
19th-century British scientists
19th-century chemists
20th-century British scientists
20th-century chemists